UFC Fight Night: Holloway vs. Oliveira (also known as UFC Fight Night 74) was a mixed martial arts event held on August 23, 2015, at the SaskTel Centre in Saskatoon, Saskatchewan, Canada.

Background
The event was the first that the organization has held in Saskatchewan and was headlined by a featherweight bout between rising stars Max Holloway and Charles Oliveira.

Two fights, Rick Story vs. Erick Silva and Marcos Rogério de Lima vs. Nikita Krylov were originally expected to take place at UFC Fight Night: Machida vs. Romero. However, on June 19, it was announced that several bouts would be postponed and moved to other events as international fighters experienced travel restrictions due to technical issues within the Bureau of Consular Affairs division of the U.S. State Department, which produces travel visas. The two pairings were left intact and were rescheduled for this event. On August 11, an injury forced Story out of the bout and Neil Magny stepped in to take his place. Magny had previously fought only 22 days before the event, when he was defeated by Demian Maia at UFC 190.

Chris Wade was expected to face Olivier Aubin-Mercier at the event. However, Wade pulled out of the bout in late July after sustaining an injury and was replaced by Tony Sims.

Sean O'Connell was expected to face UFC newcomer Misha Cirkunov at the event. However, O'Connell pulled out of the bout on August 11 due to undisclosed reasons and was replaced by another UFC newcomer in Daniel Jolly.

Results

Bonus awards
The following fighters were awarded $50,000 bonuses:
Fight of the Night: Patrick Côté vs. Josh Burkman
Performance of the Night: Frankie Perez and Felipe Arantes

See also
List of UFC events
2015 in UFC

References

UFC Fight Night
2015 in mixed martial arts
Mixed martial arts in Canada
Sports competitions in Saskatoon
August 2015 sports events in Canada